As a nickname, Ferd is usually a short form of Ferdinand. Notable people so named include:

 Ferd Burket (born 1933), American football player
 Ferd Crone (born 1954), Dutch politician
 Ferd Dreher (1913–1996), American football player
 Ferd Eunick (1892–1959), American baseball player
 Ferdinand Grapperhaus (born 1959), Dutch politician
 Ferdinand Havis (1846–1918), African-American slave, politician and businessman
 Ferd Hayward (1911–1988), Canadian racewalker
 Ferd J. Hess (1848–1928), American politician
 Ferd Johnson (1905–1996), American cartoonist
 Ferd Kayser (1833–1919), German mine manager
 Ferd Lahure (1929–2019), Luxembourgian football goalkeeper
 Ferd Wirtz (1885–1947), Luxembourgian gymnast

See also

Lists of people by nickname
Hypocorisms